Tunstallia is a genus of fungi within the family Sydowiellaceae.

Species include:
Tunstallia aculeata

References

Diaporthales